John Clay Smith Jr. (April 15, 1942 – February 15, 2018) was a lawyer, author, and American educator.

Smith was born in Omaha, Nebraska. He graduated from Creighton University in 1964. He received his master's and doctorate's degree from George Washington University. Smith also received his law degree from the Howard University School of Law and was admitted to the Nebraska bar. Smith served in the Judge Advocate General's Corps, United States Army. In 1978, President Jimmy Carter named Smith to the Equal Employment Opportunity Commission and served as interim chair in 1981 and 1982. He then served on the Howard University faculty and then retired in 2004. Smith died in Washington, D.C., from Alzheimer's disease.

Writings
Emancipation: The Making of the Black Lawyer, 1844–1944 (1993)

Notes

1942 births
2018 deaths
Military personnel from Omaha, Nebraska
Lawyers from Omaha, Nebraska
Creighton University alumni
George Washington University alumni
Howard University School of Law alumni
United States Army Judge Advocate General's Corps
Howard University faculty
Chairs of the Equal Employment Opportunity Commission
Neurological disease deaths in Washington, D.C.
Deaths from Alzheimer's disease